Hugo Armando Carvajal Barrios, nicknamed El Pollo ("The Chicken") (born 1960), is a Venezuelan diplomat and retired general. He was the head of the military intelligence in Venezuela during Hugo Chávez's government, from July 2004 to December 2011. Carvajal was arrested in Spain on 12 April 2019 based on an arrest warrant from the United States for 2011 drug trafficking charges; the U.S. asked Spain to extradite Carvajal. After the Spanish courts approved his extradition to the United States Carvajal went into hiding. On 26 March 2020, the U.S. Department of State offered $10 million for information to bring him to justice in relation to drug trafficking and narco-terrorism. On 9 September 2021 he was arrested by Spanish police in an apartment in Madrid.

Biography

Early life
Hugo Armando Carvajal Barrios was born on April 1, 1960 in Viento Fresco, a village close to Caicara de Maturín, in the state of Monagas (Eastern Llanos), or in Anzoátegui state. He finished his studies at the military academy in 1981. His sister, Wilma Carvajal, was the Mayor of the Cedeño Municipality.

Career
Carvajal met Hugo Chávez in 1980 at the military academy of Caracas, where Chávez was his instructor. Carvajal took part in the 1992 coup attempt organised by Chávez against the government of Carlos Andrés Pérez. He was detained together with Chávez and he was set free with a general amnesty that president Rafael Caldera introduced in 1994.

In September 2008, the United States Department of the Treasury's Office of Foreign Assets Control (OFAC) accused Carvajal of helping Colombian guerrilla FARC in its drug trafficking activities by protecting them from drugs seizures, supplying weapons and providing with Venezuelan official documents. He was placed on the list together with Henry Rangel Silva,  Director of Venezuela's Directorate of Intelligence and Prevention Services, who later became Minister of Defense and Governor of Trujillo and with Ramón Rodríguez Chacín, former Minister of the Interior & Security.

Carvajal was appointed head of the National Official against Organized Crime and Financing of Terrorism in October 2012. In April 2013 he was appointed as the replacement for Wilfredo Figueroa Chacín as head of the Military Counterintelligence.

Arrest
Venezuela appointed Carvajal as its consul in Aruba in January 2014, however he had not been officially accepted by the Dutch government. He was arrested in Aruba on 22 July 2014 on a U.S. arrest warrant. Venezuelan President Nicolás Maduro protested saying Carvajal had diplomatic immunity. As a protest Venezuela closed its airspace to planes coming from Aruba and Curaçao for several hours, leaving hundreds of passengers stranded. Maduro also threatened to slow down business at the Isla oil refinery on Curaçao. On July 28, he was released and flown back to Venezuela by private plane. Aruba officials declared that Dutch foreign minister Frans Timmermans had decided to recognize Carvajal's immunity. The Netherlands declared Carvajal persona non grata. In a public appearance Maduro stated: "We had a plan to escalate tension in Latin America".

One day after his release information was released that Venezuela had sent four military ships close to the shores of Aruba while Carvajal was detained. The United States Department of State said that it had evidence for severe threats by Venezuela against both Aruba and the Netherlands. The Dutch Ministry of Foreign Affairs said it had contact with Venezuela about the military ships, with Venezuela stating that they were returning from an exercise. The Dutch Ministry of Foreign Affair also stated that Carvajal was released after strictly judicial considerations based on international law.

Carvajal is also wanted by Colombia for the torture and murder of two agents.

Support for Guaidó 
On 21 February 2019, during the 2019 Venezuelan presidential crisis, Carvajal made a video in support of Juan Guaidó as interim president of Venezuela and criticized Nicolás Maduro's presidency. Carvajal calls for Venezuelan military forces to break ranks and to allow the shipping of humanitarian aid to Venezuela.

Maduro expelled Carvajal from the Armed Forces on 4 April, degraded his Major General status, and accused him of treason.

Arrest in Spain and extradition

Carvajal was arrested in Spain by local authorities in 2019 at the behest of the U.S. government. However, his extradition to the United States to stand trial for drug trafficking was not carried out after a Spanish court rejected the American request. The denial was appealed and then overturned in 2019 but Carvajal had disappeared by that point. In September 2021, Carvajal was arrested again by Spanish authorities after hiding out in Madrid for two years. His subsequent asylum claim was denied in October 2021 and his extradition was approved to go forward. The extradition was put on hold again after Carvajal appealed to the European Court of Human Rights. Carvajal faces charges of drug trafficking and narcoterrorism.

References

1960 births
Fugitives
Fugitives wanted by the United States
Living people
People of the 1992 Venezuelan coup d'état attempts
People of the Crisis in Venezuela
United Socialist Party of Venezuela politicians
Venezuelan escapees
Venezuelan defectors
Venezuelan diplomats
Venezuelan generals
Venezuelan soldiers
Venezuelan people imprisoned abroad